Srinath Soori Sooriyabandara is a Sri Lankan rugby union player who currently plays for the Kandy SC in Dialog Rugby League. He represented Sri Lanka in the 15-man code between 2009 and 2014. He is also a vital part of the National Sevens Team since 2010 and was appointed as Captain of the team for the 2018 Asia Rugby Sevens Series. He usually plays at Scrum half, but due to his versatility he can also cover Fly-Half and Full-back.

He was a member of the Sri Lankan Sevens team that won the Shield Championship at the 2014 Commonwealth Games. He is the first and only Sri Lankan to compete at the Asian Games for three consecutive years.

Rugby career

Youth
At school level, he played for Isipathana College Under 17, Under 18 and Under 19 Teams respectively. He played most of his school rugby at Full-back. Thanks to his nippy footwork and pace, Soori quickly caught the attention of major Pro-Rugby Clubs in the domestic league.

CR & FC
Right after school, Srinath Sooriyabandara joined CR & FC in 2009. He quickly started making a name for himself and soon became the club's first choice at Scrum Half. He played 3 seasons at the club.

Up Country Lions
In 2013, Soori announced that he has signed with the newly formed club Up Country Lions along with several high profiled domestic rugby players. He debuted for the Up Country Lions against Kandy Sports Club (rugby). In the following season, Srinath Sooriyabandara was appointed as the captain of the team and lead his team to a fourth-place finish in the Domestic Rugby League

Navy Sports Club
After the closure of Up Country Lions in 2014, Srinath Sooriyabandara moved to Navy SC. He was initially playing at Fly-Half in the place of the club's regular Fly-Half who was out injured. Once returned to his favored position, he was the club's first pick at Scrum-Half.

Kandy Sports Club
Srinath Sooriyabandara signed with the rugby powerhouse Kandy SC in 2015. He has been a regular at the club ever since.

See also
Rugby union in Sri Lanka

References

Living people
1989 births
Alumni of Isipathana College
Sri Lankan rugby union players
Rugby union players at the 2010 Asian Games
Rugby union players at the 2014 Asian Games
Rugby union players at the 2018 Asian Games
Commonwealth Games rugby sevens players of Sri Lanka
Rugby sevens players at the 2014 Commonwealth Games
Asian Games competitors for Sri Lanka
Sportspeople from Colombo
Rugby sevens players at the 2022 Commonwealth Games